Julio Peralta and Horacio Zeballos were the defending champions but chose not to defend their title.

Sergio Galdós and Nicolás Jarry won the title after defeating Sekou Bangoura and Evan King 6–3, 5–7, [10–1] in the final.

Seeds

Draw

References
 Main Draw

Claro Open Floridablanca - Doubles
2017 Doubles